The Pambuffetti PJ-01 is a sports car produced by Pambufetti, which was founded in 2018 by Juri Pambuffetti.

History
The PJ-01, which has gull-wing doors, was presented at Milano Monza Open-Air Motor Show in June 2021, which was the first edition of the auto show.  The production of the sports car is limited to 25 units and is scheduled to begin in Trevi in 2022. Six vehicles are to be built by hand every year. The base price before taxes is 1.5 million euros. The PJ-01 also tends to be street legal.

Specifications
The PJ-01 features high downforce values, which makes high cornering speeds and high braking deceleration possible. The power-to-weight ratio of the PJ-01 is given as 1.3 kilograms per hp. A 588 kW (800 hp) 5.2 liter V10 mid-engine empowers the car. The steering wheel is designed based on that of one used in Formula One and can also be removed. The seating position is also be based on F1 racing cars.

Notes

External links 
Pambufetti website

Cars of Italy
Coupés
Sports cars
Rear mid-engine, rear-wheel-drive vehicles
Cars introduced in 2022